Templemars is a commune in the Nord department in northern France. It is part of the Métropole Européenne de Lille. The commune has the head office of Castorama.

Heraldry

See also

Communes of the Nord department

References

External links

 Commune of Templemars 

Communes of Nord (French department)
French Flanders